Admetovis similaris is a species of cutworm or dart moth in the family Noctuidae first described by William Barnes in 1904. It is found in North America.

References

Further reading

 
 
 

Orthosiini
Articles created by Qbugbot
Moths described in 1904